The following is a partial list of the "G" codes for Medical Subject Headings (MeSH), as defined by the United States National Library of Medicine (NLM).

This list continues the information at List of MeSH codes (G01). Codes following these are found at List of MeSH codes (G03). For other MeSH codes, see List of MeSH codes.

The source for this content is the set of 2006 MeSH Trees from the NLM.

– health occupations

– acupuncture

– allied health occupations
  – audiology
  – occupational therapy
  – physical therapy (specialty)
  – speech-language pathology
  – technology, dental
  – technology, medical
  – technology, radiologic
  – teleradiology

– biomedical engineering

– chiropractic

– dentistry
  – dental research
  – dentistry, operative
  – forensic dentistry
  – general practice, dental
  – geriatric dentistry
  – military dentistry
  – occupational dentistry
  – oral medicine
  – pediatric dentistry
  – preventive dentistry
  – school dentistry
  – specialties, dental
  – endodontics
  – orthodontics
  – pathology, oral
  – pediatric dentistry
  – periodontics
  – prosthodontics
  – public health dentistry
  – community dentistry
  – surgery, oral

– dietetics

– environmental health
  – health physics
  – sanitary engineering
  – sanitation

– health services administration

– hospital administration

– medical illustration

– medicine
  – adolescent medicine
  – andrology
  – bariatrics
  – behavioral medicine
  – clinical medicine
  – evidence-based medicine
  – community medicine
  – epidemiology
  – epidemiology, molecular
  – pharmacoepidemiology
  – genetics, medical
  – geriatrics
  – medicine, herbal
  – military medicine
  – naval medicine
  – submarine medicine
  – osteopathic medicine
  – psychiatry
  – adolescent psychiatry
  – biological psychiatry
  – child psychiatry
  – community psychiatry
  – preventive psychiatry
  – forensic psychiatry
  – geriatric psychiatry
  – military psychiatry
  – social medicine
  – specialties, medical
  – aerospace medicine
  – allergy and immunology
  – anesthesiology
  – dermatology
  – emergency medicine
  – family practice
  – forensic medicine
  – forensic pathology
  – hospitalists
  – internal medicine
  – cardiology
  – endocrinology
  – gastroenterology
  – hematology
  – medical oncology
  – radiation oncology
  – nephrology
  – pulmonary disease (specialty)
  – rheumatology
  – neurology
  – pathology
  – forensic pathology
  – pathology, clinical
  – pathology, surgical
  – telepathology
  – pediatrics
  – neonatology
  – perinatology
  – physical medicine
  – physical rehabilitation
  – preventive medicine
  – environmental medicine
  – occupational medicine
  – preventive psychiatry
  – psychiatry
  – child psychiatry
  – public health
  – radiology
  – nuclear medicine
  – radiation oncology
  – radiology, interventional
  – reproductive medicine
  – venereology
  – specialties, surgical
  – colorectal surgery
  – gynecology
  – neurosurgery
  – obstetrics
  – ophthalmology
  – orthopedics
  – otolaryngology
  – regenerative medicine
  – surgery
  – surgery, plastic
  – thoracic surgery
  – urology
  – sports medicine
  – telemedicine
  – remote consultation
  – telepathology
  – teleradiology
  – traumatology
  – tropical medicine

– mortuary practice
  – burial
  – embalming

– nursing
  – nursing research
  – clinical nursing research
  – nursing administration research
  – nursing education research
  – nursing evaluation research
  – nursing methodology research
  – nursing theory
  – specialties, nursing
  – community health nursing
  – emergency nursing
  – family nursing
  – geriatric nursing
  – holistic nursing
  – maternal-child nursing
  – neonatal nursing
  – midwifery
  – military nursing
  – obstetrical nursing
  – occupational health nursing
  – oncologic nursing
  – orthopedic nursing
  – pediatric nursing
  – neonatal nursing
  – perioperative nursing
  – operating room nursing
  – postanesthesia nursing
  – psychiatric nursing
  – public health nursing
  – rehabilitation nursing
  – school nursing
  – transcultural nursing

– nursing, practical

– nutrition

– optometry

– orthoptics

– pharmacology
  – ethnopharmacology
  – medicine, herbal
  – neuropharmacology
  – pharmacoepidemiology
  – pharmacogenetics
  – toxicogenetics
  – psychopharmacology
  – toxicology
  – toxicogenetics

– pharmacy

– podiatry

– psychology, medical

– serology

– sociology, medical

– specialism

– technology, pharmaceutical

– veterinary medicine
  – pathology, veterinary
  – surgery, veterinary
  – veterinary service, military

The list continues at List of MeSH codes (G03).

G02